Gary Russell (born September 8, 1986) is a former American football running back. He was signed by the Pittsburgh Steelers as an undrafted free agent in 2007. He won Super Bowl XLIII with the Steelers against the Arizona Cardinals, scoring a touchdown in the game. He played college football at Minnesota.

Russell has also been an active roster member of the Oakland Raiders.

Early years
Russell attended Walnut Ridge High School in Columbus, Ohio.

College career
Russell played college football at Minnesota where in 2005, he went past the 1,000-yard rushing mark for the year totaling 18 rushing touchdowns while splitting carries with Laurence Maroney. Prior to the 2005 season he played sparingly behind Marion Barber III and  Maroney.

Professional career

Pittsburgh Steelers
Russell was acquired by the Pittsburgh Steelers as an undrafted free agent in 2007. He saw limited playing time, rushing for only 21 yards on 7 carries, due to playing behind Pro-Bowl running back Willie Parker and Najeh Davenport.

Russell was waived by the Steelers on September 20, 2008 to make room for linebacker Patrick Bailey, who was promoted from the practice squad to active roster. Russell was re-signed to the practice squad on September 23. Russell was promoted to the active roster again after rookie running back Rashard Mendenhall was placed on injured reserve. Gary was the Steelers main kick returner and short yardage back after coming off the practice squad in 2008.

Russell rushed for a one-yard touchdown during the second quarter of Super Bowl XLIII. He finished the game with two attempts for −3 yards and 1 touchdown on the way to his first and only Super Bowl ring.

He was released by the Steelers on April 16, 2009.

Cincinnati Bengals
Russell was claimed off waivers by the Cincinnati Bengals on April 17, 2009. However, he was released by the team just ten days later on April 27.

Oakland Raiders
Russell was signed by the Oakland Raiders on May 8, 2009.

Marion Blue Racers
In September 2012, Russell signed with the Marion Blue Racers of the Continental Indoor Football League for the 2013 season.

References

External links
Cincinnati Bengals bio
Oakland Raiders bio
Pittsburgh Steelers bio

1986 births
Living people
Players of American football from Columbus, Ohio
American football running backs
Minnesota Golden Gophers football players
Pittsburgh Steelers players
Cincinnati Bengals players
Oakland Raiders players
Marion Blue Racers players